Juan Bautista Arriaza (27 February 1770, Madrid – 22 January 1837) was a Spanish poet and writer.

Works
Firsts, 1796
Poetic Art, 1807 (L'Art poétique translation (1674) of Nicolas Boileau)
Patriotic Poems, 1810
Lyrical Poetry, 1829
Thank Terpsichore or dancing, modern edition Graces dancing, Madrid, Hero, 1936.

1770 births
1837 deaths
Writers from Madrid
Members of the Royal Spanish Academy
Spanish poets
Spanish male poets